Masjedin (also Romanized as Masjedīn and Masjedeyn; also known as Masjed, Masjed-e Bālā, Masjed-e ‘Olyā, Masjed-e Pā’īn, Masjedlar, Masjeledler, and Masjīd) is a village in Mehraban-e Olya Rural District, Shirin Su District, Kabudarahang County, Hamadan Province, Iran. At the 2006 census, its population was 1,873, in 447 families.

References 

Populated places in Kabudarahang County